Tom Greenlee was a consensus All-American defensive end at the University of Washington, drafted by the Chicago Bears as a defensive back in the 1967 NFL Draft.

High school
Greenlee attended Franklin High School where he was an All-Metro defensive back.

College
Greenlee played for the Washington Huskies from 1964 to 1966, where he was a team captain in 1966 for coach Jim Owens. He was a two-time All-AAWU and All-Coast selection.  Following his playing Washington career, Greenlee played in both the East–West Shrine Game and Hula Bowl.

Greenlee was inducted into the Husky Hall of Fame in 1987.

References

Players of American football from Seattle
All-American college football players
American football defensive ends
American football defensive tackles
Washington Huskies football players
Franklin High School (Seattle) alumni

Possibly living people
Year of birth missing